"Good Intentions" is the third official single to be released from British grime rapper Dappy's debut solo studio album, Bad Intentions. "Good Intentions" was released on 16 September 2012 as a digital download on the iTunes Store. The single was written by Dappy, and produced by Fraser T Smith. The single received its première when Dappy performed the song live at T4 on the Beach on 1 July 2012. The track later premièred on radio on 29 July 2012.

Background
The release of "Good Intentions" was confirmed by Dappy at T4 on the Beach. The song premièred on BBC Radio 1 Xtra on 29 July 2012. Dappy said of the song, that it is a little different from his previous released songs, and that in the song, he is speaking from the heart.

Music video
The music video for the song "Good Intentions" was filmed at the beginning of August 2012 in Hawaii, and was directed by Colin Tilley. The music video was released on 24 August.

Track listing

Credits and personnel
Personnel

 Lead vocals – Costadinos Contostavlos
 Producer – Fraser T Smith
 Lyrics – Costadinos Contostavlos
 Composer – Costadinos Contostavlos
 Label: Takeover Entertainment Limited

Charts

Certifications

Release history

References

2012 singles
2012 songs
Dappy songs
Songs written by Dappy
Songs written by Fraser T. Smith
Songs written by Tim Powell (producer)
Songs written by Wayne Hector
Song recordings produced by Fraser T. Smith
Takeover Entertainment singles
2010s ballads
Contemporary R&B ballads